The 1960–61 Football League season was Birmingham City Football Club's 58th in the Football League and their 34th in the First Division. They finished in 19th position in the 22-team division for the second consecutive season. They entered the 1960–61 FA Cup in the third round proper and lost to Leicester City in the fifth round after a replay, and entered the inaugural season of the Football League Cup in the second round, losing to Plymouth Argyle in the third, again after a replay. In the Inter-Cities Fairs Cup, Birmingham beat Inter Milan both at home and away in the semi-final to reach their second consecutive final, but the competition schedule meant that the match itself was played in September and October 1962, well into the 1961–62 playing season.

Manager Gil Merrick, appointed to succeed Pat Beasley at the end of the 1959–60 season, brought in former Spanish international winger Emilio Aldecoa – the first Spaniard to play in the Football League – as coach. Twenty-four players made at least one appearance in nationally organised first-team competition, and there were twelve different goalscorers. Full back Brian Farmer played in 54 of the 55 first-team matches over the season, and Jimmy Harris finished as leading goalscorer with 17 goals in all competitions; in the league, Harris and Mike Hellawell were joint top scorers, each with 10 goals.

Football League First Division

League table (part)

FA Cup

League Cup

Inter-Cities Fairs Cup

In the semi-final, Birmingham beat Inter Milan both at home and away; no other English club was to beat them in a competitive match in the San Siro until Arsenal did so in the Champions League more than 40 years later. Birmingham reached the final for the second consecutive season, having lost to Barcelona in 1960. The 1961 final was scheduled for late September and mid-October 1961, well into the 1961–62 playing season, by which time the first round of the 1961–62 competition would already be under way.

Appearances and goals

Players with name struck through and marked  left the club during the playing season.

See also
Birmingham City F.C. seasons

References
General
 
 
 Source for match dates and results: 
 Source for lineups, appearances, goalscorers and attendances: Matthews (2010), Complete Record, pp. 356–57, 474.
 Source for kit: "Birmingham City". Historical Football Kits. Retrieved 22 May 2018.

Specific

Birmingham City F.C. seasons
Birmingham City